Centaurea ammocyanus is a species of flowering plant in the family Asteraceae. It is found in Sicily and Malta.

References

External links

ammocyanus
Taxa named by Pierre Edmond Boissier